"Ms. Knope Goes to Washington" is the season premiere of the fifth season of the American comedy television series Parks and Recreation, and the 69th overall episode of the series. It originally aired on NBC in the United States on September 20, 2012.

In the episode, Leslie (Amy Poehler) and Andy (Chris Pratt) visit Ben (Adam Scott) and April (Aubrey Plaza) in Washington, D.C., while Ron (Nick Offerman) attempts to organize a barbecue for the staff.

Plot
Leslie (Amy Poehler) and Andy (Chris Pratt) are visiting Washington, D.C., to see Ben (Adam Scott), who accepted a temporary job there for a congressional re-election campaign, and April (Aubrey Plaza), who decided to join Ben as his intern. Leslie is thrilled to be in the capital and also hopes to secure federal funding to clean the Pawnee River, but her optimism is dulled when she is unable to meet with anyone at the United States Department of the Interior, resulting in her proposal being tossed into a giant pile with numerous other unread proposals.

In Pawnee, Ron (Nick Offerman) says that with Leslie absent, he will take over the "Leslie Knope Employment Enjoyment Summer Slam Grill Jam Fun-Splosion", an annual barbecue for the Parks department but plans to make it just about meat with no other types of food or even activities. Tom (Aziz Ansari) and Ann (Rashida Jones) have long since broken up but pretend to still be a couple and even live together just so they don't have to endure teasing at work (and Tom does not want to lose a bet about how long the relationship will last to Donna (Retta)). Ann finds the ruse difficult because of Tom's stupidity, such as putting glitter into the laundry and butter.

Ben invites Leslie to a cocktail party, but she is intimidated by the numerous beautiful and powerful women (Lauren White and Jessica Hansen) whom Ben must work with every day and feels that her being elected to city council is feeble compared to their positions of power. Leslie feels so inferior that she barely reacts when meeting two of her idols, Senator Barbara Boxer and Senator Olympia Snowe. She sulks in the coatroom and rebuffs words of comfort from a concerned man, not realizing it was Senator John McCain.

Ron brings a pig named Tom that he will slaughter and cook to the park but is informed that it violates numerous laws; plus it horrifies the Parks department. Annoyed, Ron instead buys pounds of meat which will take several hours to cook, refusing to buy any other food for his hungry and bored subordinates. Chris (Rob Lowe) notices the frustration of the Parks department and repeatedly gives Ron suggestions to improve the barbecue, but the stubborn Ron ignores him. Everyone complaining to Ron eventually causes him to drive off with the smoking barbecue still attached to his car. The next day, Chris confronts Ron as a boss, explaining that the barbecue is meant to boost morale and show appreciation for the staff. Ron finally accepts Chris' advice and throws a small barbecue in the office for the staff, even adding corn to the mix.

To avenge her wardrobe, Ann dumps glitter into Tom's facial cream (although he likes the idea of glitter cream). Donna sees them fighting and reveals that she knew they were not actually together. Ann and Tom finally drop the ruse and Donna drops the bet with Tom. Back in Pawnee, Leslie complains to Andy about how insignificant she feels, her worries that Ben will fall for one of the female lobbyists in DC, and how her proposal will be forgotten. Andy reassures her and a rejuvenated Leslie later holds a press conference declaring that she will spend time every weekend cleaning the Pawnee River herself, during which time she would be accessible to the citizens of Pawnee. She and Ben later Skype with each other, which removes any worries she had about their relationship.

Production
"Ms. Knope Goes to Washington" was written by Aisha Muharrar and directed by Dean Holland. Within a week of the episode's original broadcast, three deleted scenes were placed on the official Parks and Recreation website. The first, 80-second clip, is an extended version of the episode's opening, featuring Andy and Leslie discussing the polluted Pawnee River and their upcoming trip to Washington. The second clip was only 30 seconds long, and consisted of Tom and Donna criticizing Ron's barbecue. In the third, 90-second clip, Leslie's jealousy of Ben and discomfort in Washington is emphasized as she compares their relationship to the Clintons'.

There were also three "Extra Bits" placed on the website, all of which are connected, due to focusing on the character of Andy Dwyer. The first was a 2-minute clip of Andy presenting many Washington, D.C., "facts" (mostly incorrect) in his role as a tour guide. The second was a 90-second clip in which Andy attempts to find a secret city of gold beneath Washington, D.C., using clues found on U.S. money. He believes himself to have ultimately succeeded when he finds coins in a fountain outside of the U.S. Navy headquarters. In the last, 70-second clip, Andy discusses Burt Macklin and his numerous other secret identities, before attempting to break into the FBI headquarters.

NBC additionally produced a website about Ron's barbecue, titled "Ron Swanson's Grilling Webpage". The site featured Ron's advice on how to grill, a page where visitors could add their own barbecue recipes, and a store selling barbecue sauce, a grilling apron, and a Swanson T-shirt.

Cultural references
 The title references the film Mr. Smith Goes to Washington.
 Andy mistakes one of the trains in the Museum, Southern Railway 1401, for the time train seen at the end of Back to the Future Part III.

Reception
"Ms. Knope Goes to Washington" received generally positive reviews. The A.V. Club writer Steve Heisler gave the episode an A−, saying, "how awesome is this show that it’s transformed before our very eyes so slowly that it seems totally natural? To me, that’s the essence of great TV writing: It takes bold steps, but makes total sense in hindsight". He particularly cited Leslie's emotional breakdown and the friendship between Ron and Chris. Alan Sepinwall of HitFix praised the use of the location scenes in Washington, D.C., as well as the split of Ann and Tom as a romantic couple. Matt Fowler of IGN gave the episode a score of 9.0, saying the series "continues its run of being infinitely quotable while having some of the funniest and sweetest characters on TV". He emphasized the role of the character Andy in this episode and the series generally for being "incredibly key to the comedy".

References

External links
 

2012 American television episodes
Parks and Recreation (season 5) episodes
Television episodes set in Washington, D.C.